Abcon Complex & Towers is a planned building complex in Nairobi, Kenya's capital and largest city.

Location
The skyscraper would lie at the junction of  Haile Selassie Avenue and Lower Hill Road. The coordinates of the proposed building are: 1°17'39.0"S, 36°48'55.0"E (Latitude:-1.294153; Longitude:36.815265).

Overview
The development would consist of (a) an 18-floor hotel (b) residential apartments occupying 17 floors (c) office space on 22 floors (d) parking space for 1,320 vehicles (e) an amphitheater and (f) retail space on three floors.

Construction costs
The budgeted construction cost is KSh5.52 billion (approx. US$55.5 million).
Note:US$1.00 = KSh99.46 on 26 April 2016.

Ownership
The development is owned by a consortium of seven investors, under the service vehicle called Greenfield Developers Limited. The shareholding in the project is as depicted in the table below:

See also
 List of tallest buildings in Nairobi
 Nairobi

References

Buildings and structures in Nairobi
Skyscraper office buildings in Kenya